Obelisco  may refer to:

Obelisk of Buenos Aires, in Argentina
Obelisco (Guatemala City), in Guatemala